Big Sioux Prehistoric Prairie Procurement System Archaeological District is a discontiguous  historic district of 30 sites located along  of river terraces and blufftops in Lyon County, Iowa.  The sites are both large and small in size and they "contain a representative sample of the best preserved elements of a hunting and gathering system" of the native peoples who inhabited the northwest Iowa plains from 10,000 to 200 years ago.  They include late base camps, deeply-buried early Archaic camps, and procurement sites from all time periods in the Pre-Columbian era. The district was listed on the National Register of Historic Places in 1989.

References

Archaic period in North America
Native American history of Iowa
Protected areas of Lyon County, Iowa
National Register of Historic Places in Lyon County, Iowa
Archaeological sites on the National Register of Historic Places in Iowa
Historic districts on the National Register of Historic Places in Iowa
Historic districts in Lyon County, Iowa